GrandView is  an outlining and personal information management (PIM) application originally developed by Living Videotext. Living Videotext was acquired by Symantec in 1987. Grandview was sold until the early 1990s and is no longer supported by Symantec.
It closely resembled PC-Outline, an outliner for IBM PCs of the 1980s.  Grandview was derived from the same software.

Reception
BYTE in 1989 listed GrandView as among the "Distinction" winners of the BYTE Awards, stating that it was "packed with goodies" and worth the time necessary to learn how to use it.

See also 
 Outliner

References

External links 
Compute! magazine review of Grandview 2.0, 1992
Home Office Computing review, 1991
History of Symantec Corporation
A version of GrandView 2.0 for DOS that is completely portable, fully functional, and ready to run on any modern version of Windows up to Windows 10, using vDos-lfn 
GrandView 2.0 Reference Guide 737 pages 

Gen Digital software
Personal information managers
Outliners
DOS software